The 2005-6 V-League season was the second season of the V-League, the highest professional volleyball league in South Korea. The season began on 3 December 2005 and finished on 2 April 2006.

Hyundai Capital Skywalkers were the new champions in the men's league and Cheonan Heungkuk Pink Spiders were the new champions in women's league.

Teams

Men's clubs

Women's clubs

Regular season

League table (Men's)

League table (Women's)

Final stage

Bracket (Men's)

Bracket (Women's)

Top Scorers

Men's

Women's

Player of the Round

Men's

Women's

Final standing

Men's League

Women's League

References

External links
 Official website 

2005 in volleyball
2006 in volleyball
V-League (South Korea)